Philippe Chiffre is a French cinema Production Designer.

Biography
Philippe Chiffre is the son of Yvan Chiffre, and the father of Cesar Chiffre.

Painter, he started as an intern in the decoration in the cinema 1974 to Zorro of Duccio Tessari. Intern, assistant, assembler, head painter, he traveled all the posts on twenty films before becoming a Production Designer in 1988.

Filmography
 2010 : Cloclo
 2010 : La croisière
 2010 : Point Blank
 2010 : Les petits mouchoirs
 2010 : 22 Bullets
 2009 : De l'autre côté du lit 
 2008 : Pour elle 
 2008 : Modern Love
 2007 : Hellphone
 2007 : Vent mauvais
 2006 : Tell No One
 2005 : La boîte noire 
 2004 : Dans tes rêves
 2003 : Narco
 2002 : À ton image
 2001 : Mortel transfert
 2000 : Woman on Top 
 1999 : Rembrandt (film, 1999)
 1998 : Une vie de prince
 1997 : Assassin(s)
 1996 : Un samedi sur la terre
 1996 : L'appartement 
 1995 : Pullman paradis
 1994 : Petits arrangements avec les morts
 1994 : Mina Tannenbaum
 1992 : La petite apocalypse
 1990 : Plaisir d'amour
 1989 : President's Target
 1987 : Camomille

Awards
 2000 : César Award for Best Production Design for Rembrandt.

References

 

French production designers
Living people
Year of birth missing (living people)